The 2017 UEFA European Under-17 Championship (also known as UEFA Under-17 Euro 2017) was the 16th edition of the UEFA European Under-17 Championship (35th edition if the Under-16 era is also included), the annual international youth football championship organised by UEFA for the men's under-17 national teams of Europe. Croatia, which were selected by UEFA on 26 January 2015, hosted the tournament.

A total of 16 teams played in the tournament, with players born on or after 1 January 2000 eligible to participate. Each match had a duration of 80 minutes, consisting of two halves of 40 minutes with a 15-minute half-time.

Same as previous editions held in odd-numbered years, the tournament acted as the UEFA qualifiers for the FIFA U-17 World Cup. The top five teams of the tournament qualified for the 2017 FIFA U-17 World Cup in India as the UEFA representatives. This was decreased from the previous six teams, as FIFA decided to give one of the slots originally reserved for UEFA to the Oceania Football Confederation starting from 2017.

Spain won their third title by beating England 4–1 on penalties in the final after a 2–2 draw, and both teams were joined by Germany, Turkey, France as UEFA qualifiers for the 2017 FIFA U-17 World Cup. Portugal were the defending champions, but failed to qualify.

Qualification

All 54 UEFA nations entered the competition, and with the hosts Croatia qualifying automatically, the other 53 teams competed in the qualifying competition to determine the remaining 15 spots in the final tournament. The qualifying competition consisted of two rounds: Qualifying round, which took place in autumn 2016, and Elite round, which took place in spring 2017.

Qualified teams
The following 16 teams qualified for the final tournament.

Note: All appearance statistics include only U-17 era (since 2002).

Notes

Final draw
The final draw was held on 3 April 2017, 18:00 CEST (UTC+2), at the Panorama Zagreb Hotel in Zagreb, Croatia. The 16 teams were drawn into four groups of four teams. Hosts Croatia were assigned to position A1 in the draw, while the other teams were seeded according to their results in the qualification elite round, with the seven best elite round group winners (counting all elite round results) placed in Pot 1 and drawn to positions 1 and 2 in the groups, and the remaining eight teams (the eighth-best elite round group winner and the seven elite round group runners-up) placed in Pot 2 and drawn to positions 3 and 4 in the groups.

Venues
At first, it was announced that eight stadiums would host the competition, each of those being in Istria and Primorje. Later, that was changed.

Rijeka and Kostrena were the only hosts that were planned at first with new hosts being Varaždin, Zaprešić, Velika Gorica and two in Croatian capital Zagreb – in boroughs Sesvete and Lučko. The final would be played in Varaždin.

Match officials
A total of 9 referees, 12 assistant referees and 3 fourth officials were appointed for the final tournament.

Referees
 Dominik Ouschan
 Nicolas Laforge
 Fran Jović
 Dimitrios Massias
 Jens Maae
 Anastasios Papapetrou
 Donatas Rumšas
 Fábio Veríssimo
 Mohammed Al-Hakim

Assistant referees
 Atom Sevgulyan
 Radek Kotik
 Mika Lamppu
 Idan Yarkoni
 Samat Tergeussizov
 Jevgeņijs Morozovs
 Goce Petreski
 Paul Robinson
 Manuel Fernandes
 Mircea Grigoriu
 Aleksei Vorontsov
 Ian Bird

Fourth officials
 Tihomir Pejin
 Duje Strukan
 Mario Zebec

Squads

Each national team submitted a squad of 18 players.

Group stage
The final tournament schedule was confirmed on 7 April 2017.

The group winners and runners-up advance to the quarter-finals.

Tiebreakers
The teams are ranked according to points (3 points for a win, 1 point for a draw, 0 points for a loss). If two or more teams are equal on points on completion of the group matches, the following tie-breaking criteria are applied, in the order given, to determine the rankings (Regulations Articles 17.01 and 17.02):
Higher number of points obtained in the group matches played among the teams in question;
Superior goal difference resulting from the group matches played among the teams in question;
Higher number of goals scored in the group matches played among the teams in question;
If, after having applied criteria 1 to 3, teams still have an equal ranking, criteria 1 to 3 are reapplied exclusively to the group matches between the teams in question to determine their final rankings. If this procedure does not lead to a decision, criteria 5 to 9 apply;
Superior goal difference in all group matches;
Higher number of goals scored in all group matches;
If only two teams have the same number of points, and they are tied according to criteria 1 to 6 after having met in the last round of the group stage, their rankings are determined by a penalty shoot-out (not used if more than two teams have the same number of points, or if their rankings are not relevant for qualification for the next stage).
Lower disciplinary points total based only on yellow and red cards received in the group matches (red card = 3 points, yellow card = 1 point, expulsion for two yellow cards in one match = 3 points);
Higher position in the coefficient ranking list used for the qualifying round draw;
Drawing of lots.

All times are local, CEST (UTC+2).

Group A

Group B

Group C

Group D

Knockout stage
In the knockout stage, penalty shoot-out is used to decide the winner if necessary (no extra time is played).

As part of a trial sanctioned by the IFAB to reduce the advantage of the team shooting first in a penalty shoot-out, a different sequence of taking penalties, known as "ABBA", that mirrors the serving sequence in a tennis tiebreak would be used if a penalty shoot-out was needed (team A kicks first, team B kicks second):
Original sequence
AB AB AB AB AB (sudden death starts) AB AB etc.
Trial sequence
AB BA AB BA AB (sudden death starts) BA AB etc.

Bracket

Quarter-finals
Winners qualified for 2017 FIFA U-17 World Cup. The two best losing quarter-finalists entered the FIFA U-17 World Cup play-off.

Ranking of losing quarter-finalists
To determine the two best losing quarter-finalists which enter the FIFA U-17 World Cup play-off, the losing quarter-finalists are ranked by the following criteria (Regulations Article 16.06):
Higher position in the group stage (i.e., group winners ahead of group runners-up);
Better results in the group stage (i.e., points, goal difference, goals scored);
Better results in the quarter-finals (i.e., points, goal difference, goals scored);
Lower disciplinary points in the group stage and quarter-finals combined;
Higher position in the coefficient ranking list used for the qualifying round draw;
Drawing of lots.

FIFA U-17 World Cup play-off
Winner qualified for 2017 FIFA U-17 World Cup.

Semi-finals

Final

Goalscorers

Team of the Tournament

Goalkeepers
 Dominik Kotarski
 Álvaro Fernández

Defenders
 Marc Guehi
 Jonathan Panzo
 Hakim Guenouche
 Jan Boller
 Víctor Chust
 Mateu Morey

Midfielders
 Callum Hudson-Odoi
 George McEachran
 Claudio Gomes
 Elias Abouchabaka
 Moha
 Atalay Babacan

Forwards
 Phil Foden
 Jadon Sancho
 Amine Gouiri
 Abel Ruiz

Qualified teams for FIFA U-17 World Cup
The following five teams from UEFA qualified for the 2017 FIFA U-17 World Cup.

1 Bold indicates champion for that year. Italic indicates host for that year.

Notes

References

External links

2016/17 final tournament: Croatia, UEFA.com

 
2017
Under-17 Championship
2017 Uefa European Under-19 Championship
2016–17 in Croatian football
May 2017 sports events in Europe
2017 in youth association football